Gort railway station is a railway station that serves the town of Gort in County Galway, Ireland.

History
The station originally opened on 15 September 1869 and closed on 5 April 1976. As part of Iarnród Éireann's Western Rail Corridor project, under the Transport 21 plan, Iarnród Éireann rebuilt the station. Work on Gort station was planned to start in 2008. However, an objection raised by a local company on the basis of traffic hazards regarding the proposal to rebuild the old station. In January 2009, this objection was withdrawn, allowing Iarnród Éireann to begin work rebuilding the station. The new station opened in March 2010.

References

External links
Irish Rail Gort Station Website

Iarnród Éireann stations in County Galway
Railway stations opened in 1869
Railway stations closed in 1976
Railway stations opened in 2010
1869 establishments in Ireland
Railway stations in the Republic of Ireland opened in the 19th century